Mister Chile is a national beauty pageant that selects Chile's representative to the male pageants. The Ft Model Chile organizes the pageant since 2009. Felipe Toledo Gaete is the current director of the Mister Chile competition.

Titleholders
Color key

Representatives at Mister International
Color key

The winner of Mister Chile represents Chile at the Mister International pageant. On occasion, when the winner does not qualify (due to age) for either contest, a runner-up is sent.

Representatives at Mister Global 

Color key

See also
Miss Universo Chile

References

External links
 Official website

Beauty pageants in Chile
2009 establishments in Chile
Chilean awards
Male beauty pageants
Mister Global by country